The Hinckley 42 Competition is an American sailboat that was designed by McCurdy & Rhodes as a racer and first built in 1982.

The Hinckley 42 Competition is a development of the Sou'wester 42/43, also a McCurdy & Rhodes design.

Production
The design was built by Hinckley Yachts in Southwest Harbor, Maine, United States, starting in 1982, but it is now out of production.

Design
The Hinckley 42 Competition is a racing keelboat, built predominantly of fiberglass. It has a masthead sloop rig, an internally mounted spade-type rudder and a fixed fin keel. It displaces .

See also
List of sailing boat types

References

Keelboats
1980s sailboat type designs
Sailing yachts
Sailboat type designs by McCurdy & Rhodes
Sailboat types built by Hinckley Yachts